Sankofa Television, a subsidiary of Sankofa Media Group LLC is based in Ghana.

Sankofa TV serves African migrant audiences and other nationals interested in African affairs.
Established in 2001, it is the first Sub-Saharan TV station in Europe for Africans.

Television channels and stations established in 2001
Television stations in Ghana